Minaret Khaje Alam belongs to the Timurid Empire and is located at Hatef street in Isfahan.  This relic was recorded in Iran's National Heritage on 6 January 1932.

References

Architecture in Iran
Islamic architecture
Islamic art
Buildings and structures in Isfahan
Isfahan County